Matthew Jack Leach (born 22 June 1991) is an English professional cricketer who plays internationally for the England Test cricket team. In domestic cricket, he represents Somerset. Leach made his Test debut in 2018. He plays as a left-arm orthodox spin bowler.

Early life and education
Leach was born in Taunton, England on 22 June 1991, and attended Trinity School, Bishop Fox's School and Richard Huish College all in Taunton. He used to be employed to park trolleys at a branch of Sainsbury's supermarket in Taunton. At the age of 14, Leach was diagnosed with Crohn's disease.

Cricket career
Leach graduated from the Somerset County Cricket Club academy in the summer of 2010, prior to signing a professional contract with Somerset. Leach represented Dorset County Cricket Club in the 2010 Minor Counties Cricket Championship, and bowled his side to victory in the final against Lincolnshire taking 6/21 in their second innings. Leach completed his degree at the University of Wales Institute, Cardiff in sports coaching. Whilst attending university Leach represented Cardiff MCCU in 2011 and 2012 making his first-class debut against his county side Somerset in March 2012, bowling 41 overs but failing to take a wicket as Somerset amassed 642/3d.

Leach made his Somerset debut in a two-day match against the touring South Africans in July 2012, claiming the prized wicket of Hashim Amla. He made his first-class debut for Somerset in the 2012 County Championship match against Lancashire in August 2012, the rain affected match finished as a draw with Leach claiming Kyle Hogg as his maiden first-class wicket. Further opportunities in the first team were limited for the rest of the 2012 season with the signing of Pakistani spinner Abdur Rehman, and Leach only featured in one further County Championship match and three matches in the 2012 Clydesdale Bank 40, but ended the season ninth in the national first-class averages with 12 wickets at 18.83 runs apiece. Leach spent the 2012–13 winter playing grade cricket for Valley District Cricket Club in Brisbane, Australia, helping his side to win the T20 competition.

Leach returned to Somerset for pre-season on a summer contract and played his first Championship game of the season against Warwickshire due to an injury to first choice spinner George Dockrell; he took his maiden five-wicket haul in the second innings, with 24 of his 44 overs being maidens. Leach made his Twenty20 debut on 23 June 2021, for Somerset in the 2021 T20 Blast.

In April 2022, he was bought by the Birmingham Phoenix for the 2022 season of The Hundred.

International career
On 14 February 2018, while playing for the England Lions against West Indies A, Leach achieved match figures of 8–110; in doing so, he beat the previous best figures by an England Lions spinner (Graeme Swann's 8–156).

On 16 March 2018, he was called up to England's Test squad for the tour of New Zealand as an injury replacement for Mason Crane. He made his debut in the second Test in Christchurch.

In an unusual circumstance, with one over left to play in the day during a Test match against Sri Lanka on 15 November 2018, Leach opened England's innings as a nightwatchman, surviving till stumps. He was dismissed for 1 off 11 balls the next morning. In July 2019, in the one-off Test against Ireland, Leach was once again the nightwatchman for England, batting for a single over at the close of day one. England won the Test by 143 runs, with Leach scoring 92 runs, which earned him the man of the match award.

He was then recalled for the second Ashes test at Lords, on 14 August 2019, where he scored 6 not out in the first innings and took 1-19 and 3–37 in Australia's first and second innings respectively. England drew the match.

Leach scored one run, tying the game, in a partnership of 76 with Ben Stokes, to help England win the third Ashes test at Headingley, by one wicket. It has been described as "arguably the greatest one not out in the history of the game".

Leach gained a cult following over the summer of 2019, with his glasses being a contributing factor. He regularly cleans them through his innings, and has received free Specsavers glasses for life following his heroics supporting Ben Stokes in the dramatic Headingley test. This cult reputation was enhanced by his behaviour off the pitch, such as leading some of the England team out to recreate his famous run at Headingley after the match.

On 29 May 2020, Leach was named in a 55-man group of players to begin training ahead of international fixtures starting in England following the COVID-19 pandemic. On 17 June 2020, Leach was included in England's 30-man squad to start training behind closed doors for the Test series against the West Indies. On 4 July 2020, Leach was named as one of the nine reserve players for the first Test match of the series.

See also
 List of people diagnosed with Crohn's disease

References

External links

1991 births
Living people
Sportspeople from Taunton
Alumni of Cardiff Metropolitan University
English cricketers
England Test cricketers
Dorset cricketers
Cardiff MCCU cricketers
Somerset cricketers
Marylebone Cricket Club cricketers
People with Crohn's disease